The South Texas Open was a golf tournament on the Nike Tour. It ran from 1990 to 1993. It was played at NorthShore Country Club in Portland, Texas.

Winners

Bolded golfers graduated to the PGA Tour via the final Nike Tour money list.

References

Former Korn Ferry Tour events
Golf in Texas
San Patricio County, Texas
Recurring sporting events established in 1990
Recurring sporting events disestablished in 1993
1990 establishments in Texas
1993 disestablishments in Texas